Lierneux is a municipality of Wallonia located in the province of Liège, Belgium. 

On January 1, 2006, Lierneux had a total population of 3,367. The total area is 92.08 km2 which gives a population density of 37 inhabitants per km2. Lierneux is known for its psychiatric hospital CHS l'Accueil.

The municipality consists of the following districts: Arbrefontaine, and Bra, and Lierneux.

History
Within the bounds of the municipality a lies a memorial site to the tribute of the 82nd Airborne Division who won the Battle of the Bulge against the German SS division December 22, 1944.

See also
 List of protected heritage sites in Lierneux

References

Bibliography

External links
 

Municipalities of Liège Province